TriPod is a rock trio with no guitars or keyboards.

TriPod uses non-traditional instruments in the melodic line (bass, brass, theremin, and woodwinds). The band has been classified as jazz fusion, Canterbury, world music, progressive rock, alternative rock, Rock in Opposition, and avant-garde, but TriPod considers itself a rock band.

TriPod performs only original music and includes improvisation in stage performances and on albums. The band was discovered at CBGBs in New York City by Genya Ravan and tours internationally, performing in venues from clubs to international festivals: 2005 - Baja Prog Festival (Mexico); 2006 - Zappanale Festival (Germany), North West Rock Festival (Croatia), Burg Herzberg Festival (Germany); 2007 - European tour (Germany, Croatia, Serbia, Hungary, Slovenia, Bosnia, Netherlands, Belgium).

It is composed of three New York musicians: Clint Bahr  (12-string bass guitar, Chapman Stick, Taurus pedals, Theremin, vocals), Keith Gurland (alto and tenor sax, flute, clarinet, panpipes, pedals, vocals) and Steve Romano (acoustic and electric drums and percussion).

Following in the tradition of King Crimson and Emerson, Lake & Palmer, TriPod creates symphonic rock music. At one point Pierre Moerlen from Gong was a band member.

TriPod's album was released by Moonjune Records, known for promoting artists such as Soft Machine and Elton Dean.

References 

 Lucky, J. The Progressive Rock Files, 2000, Collector's Guide Publishing,
 Martin, B., Avant Rock: Experimental Music from the Beatles to Björk, 2002, Open Court Publishing,

External links 
 

Musical groups from New York City
Progressive rock musical groups from New York (state)
Musical groups established in 1998
American musical trios